Awakening is the second studio album by Swiss singer and fiddle player Sebalter. It was released in Switzerland on 20 January 2017 by Phonag Records. The album has peaked to number 9 on the Swiss Albums Chart. The album includes the single "Weeping Willow".

Singles
"Weeping Willow" was released as the lead single from the album. He performed the song on ESC 2017 – Die Entscheidungsshow.

Track listing

Chart performance

Weekly charts

Release history

References

2017 albums
Sebalter albums